Smyrna is a genus of butterflies in the family Nymphalidae found from Mexico to South America.

Species
 Smyrna blomfildia (Fabricius, 1781) – Blomfild's beauty 
 Smyrna karwinskii Geyer, [1833] – Karwinski's beauty

References

External links

Coeini
Nymphalidae of South America
Butterfly genera
Taxa named by Jacob Hübner